Open assessment is a method for making impact assessments where anyone can participate and contribute. Most open assessments have been made in Opasnet, which is a wiki-based web-workspace specifically designed for this purpose. The open assessment method has been developed in the Finnish Institute for Health and Welfare (THL) in Finland originally for providing guidance in complex environmental health problems. So far, it has been applied on e.g. air pollution and pollutants in fish.  Opasnet has won the World Summit Award Finland competition, the eGovernment and Institutions category.

See also

 Opasnet
 Health impact assessment
 Risk assessment
 Environmental health

References

External links
 Description of open assessment in Opasnet

Impact assessment
Probability assessment
Risk management
Open government